Maria Aurora may refer to:

People

 Maria Aurora Salvagno, Italian sprinter
 Maria Aurora von Königsmarck, Swedish noblewoman
 Maria Aurora Couto, Indian writer
 Maria Aurora Uggla, Swedish lady-in-waiting
 Maria Aurora von Spiegel, mistress of Augustus II the Strong
 Maria Aurora (writer), Portuguese writer (1937–2010)

Places

 Maria Aurora, Aurora, municipality in the Philippines
 Maria Aurora National High School